Borș de burechiușe or borș de burechițe or supă de găluște is a Romanian and Moldovan dish specific from the regional cuisine of Moldavia and of Bukovina. Burechiușe or gălușcă also known as urechiușe (little ears) is a dough in the shape of a ravioli-like square which is filled with mushrooms such as boletus edulis, and sealed around its edges and then tossed and subsequently boiled in a ciorbă. The borș de burechiușe are traditionally eaten in the last day of fasting at the time of the Christmas Eve.

Etymology 
In Bukovina and Moldavia regions, the word borș is a synonym of the soup called ciorbă.
The etymology of burechiușe is not clear. Burechițe may derive its name from the Turkish börek,  indicating cultural and culinary influences coming from the Ottoman Empire. It could also take its name from that of the mushroom boletus, burete in its rhotacized Romanian language version, by the pattern of the ravioli.

See also 
 Börek
 Ciorbă
 Colțunași
 Chiburekki
 List of soups
 Moldovan cuisine
 Romanian cuisine

Notes and references 

Romanian soups
Christmas in Romania
Dumplings
Moldovan cuisine
Christmas food